Runtunia is a genus of moths belonging to the subfamily Tortricinae of the family Tortricidae. It consists of only one species, Runtunia runtunica, which is found in Ecuador in the provinces of Pichincha and Napo and in Bolivia.

The wingspan is about 18 mm. The ground colour of the forewings is cream, with a slight ochreous admixture and somewhat darker veins. The markings are greyish brown. The hindwings are cream, somewhat tinged with ochreous on the periphery.

Etymology
The generic name refers to the name of the type locality of the type species and is derived from Runtun on Tungurahua volcano). The specific name refers to the type locality.

See also
List of Tortricidae genera

References

External links
Tortricid.net

Euliini
Monotypic moth genera
Taxa named by Józef Razowski
Moths of South America